Nathaniel Richards (1604–1681) was a founding settler of Hartford and Norwalk, Connecticut. He served as a deputy of the General Court of the Connecticut Colony from Norwalk in October 1658.

He came to the Massachusetts Bay Colony from England in 1632 on the Lyon. He originally settled in Cambridge in 1633, and moved to Hartford in 1636 along with Thomas Hooker and about one hundred others. His home in Hartford was near the north bank of the Little River about where the west part of Pearl Street is now.

He served as a constable in 1642 and 1650. He served as a townsman in 1945.

He was one of the signers of the agreement for the planting Norwalk June 19, 1650, and moved there in the same year. He served as a deputy of the General Court in 1658, as a selectman in 1670.

He is listed on the Founders Stone bearing the names of the founders of Hartford in the Ancient Burying Ground in Hartford, and he is also listed on the Founders Stone bearing the names of the founders of Norwalk in the East Norwalk Historical Cemetery.

References 

1604 births
1681 deaths
Farmers from Connecticut
American Puritans
Connecticut city council members
Deputies of the Connecticut General Court (1639–1662)
Founders of Hartford, Connecticut
Founding settlers of Norwalk, Connecticut
English emigrants